Flydubai Flight 981 was a scheduled international passenger flight from Dubai International Airport, in the United Arab Emirates, to Rostov-on-Don Airport, Russia.  On 19 March 2016, the Boeing 737-800 aircraft serving the flight crashed during a go-around, killing all 62 passengers and crew on board. The plane crash is known as the Rostov Airport disaster.

The flight occurred at night and the weather at Rostov was poor. Flight 981 aborted its first landing attempt and went into a holding pattern for nearly two hours before making a second landing attempt. After aborting the second attempt, the aircraft climbed sharply during the go-around procedure, then descended rapidly and crashed onto the runway.

Background

Airline 
Flydubai is an Emirati state-owned low-cost carrier, with its hub in Dubai. Its chairman, Sheikh Ahmed bin Saeed Al Maktoum, is also the chairman of Dubai-based Emirates. Flydubai was founded and commenced operations in 2009 and expanded rapidly. By the end of 2015, it flew to over 100 destinations, including 11 in Russia. Its entire fleet consisted of Boeing 737-800s at that time. Flydubai launched its Rostov-on-Don service in September 2013 with two scheduled flights per week.

The airline had no previous fatal accidents before and had an "excellent safety record". In 2015, Flydubai passed the safety audit of the IATA, and several days before the crash had become an official member of the organisation. In the aftermath of the crash, Flydubai pilots raised concerns about rostering-related fatigue. A pilot told BBC News on a condition of anonymity that staff had insufficient time to rest between shifts. The pilot shared their concern with a senior member of the staff, who replied that "we don't have a fatigue issue at Flydubai." Another employee said it was their belief that, of the 25 active pilots (out of a total of 600) who resigned from the airline in 2016, most had done so because of "fatigue, rosters and quality of life." It was the opinion of some of those pilots that an accident was inevitable. In response to the allegations, Flydubai stated that, "we are unable to disclose confidential information relating to our employees."

Aircraft 
The aircraft involved was a five-year-old Boeing 737-8KN, registered as A6-FDN, MSN 40241, powered by two CFM International CFM56-7B27 engines. Its first flight was on 21 December 2010, and it was delivered to Flydubai on 24 January 2011. The aircraft had passed a C-grade maintenance check on 21 January 2016.

Flight 981 carried enough fuel for 8.5 hours of flight; it had been flying for six hours prior to the crash.

Flight crew 
The captain was 37-year-old Aristos Sokratous, from Cyprus. He had over 6,000 hours of total flying time, including 4,905 hours on the Boeing 737. Sokratous was promoted to captain a year and a half before the crash. At the time of the crash, he had intended to quit the airline after accepting a job from Ryanair, which would allow him to be based with his family in Cyprus. His wife was due to give birth to their first child a few weeks after the crash. According to several Flydubai staff members, Sokratous decided to leave the airline mainly because of fatigue and lifestyle issues and Flight 981 was one of his last flights with the airline.

The first officer, 36-year-old Alejandro Cruz Álava, was from Spain. He had more than 5,700 hours of flying time, with 1,100 of them on the Boeing 737. He started flying with Flydubai in 2013, two years before the crash, and had previously flown two regional airlines in the Spanish Canary Islands – Binter and Naysa – before joining the airline.

According to the final report by the Interstate Aviation Committee (IAC), the accident flight was both pilots' first ever flight to Rostov. The captain had experience flying into other Russian airports, but the first officer did not.

Weather 
The meteorological conditions in Rostov-on-Don airport were described as "adverse".

Flight

Flight 981 was scheduled to depart from Dubai International Airport at 21:45 Gulf Standard Time (UTC+4) on 18 March 2016 and arrive at Rostov-on-Don Airport at 01:20 Moscow Standard Time (UTC+3) the next day. It departed from Dubai after a 35-minute delay, at 22:20 GST. When Flight 981 arrived at the initial fix, to begin the approach to Rostov-on-Don, two other flights had landed during the previous twenty minutes.

An alert from Flight 981's onboard windshear warning system caused the pilots to abandon their landing approach a few kilometres from the runway. The flight entered a holding pattern near the airport, awaiting improvement to the weather. While Flight 981 was holding, Aeroflot Flight 1166 made three unsuccessful attempts to land and then diverted to nearby Krasnodar Airport, landing there at 02:59.

In contrast to the first go-around, they retracted the landing gear and reduced the flap setting. This caused the nose to pitch up significantly, which the captain (who was flying the airplane) had to counter with considerable effort on the control column. The captain pressed the nose-down trim switch, but continued to push the control column as well. This caused the aircraft to pitch down and enter a 45 degree descent. At 03:42 it crashed onto the runway not far from the threshold, and caught fire. Pieces of the aircraft were strewn across runway 22 during the impact.

Victims 

All 62 people on board, 55 passengers and 7 crew members, died in the crash. Of the passengers, 44 (including four children) were Russian citizens. Eight other passengers came from Ukraine, two from India and one from Uzbekistan. Thirty of the passengers were tourists on a package tour from Natalie Tours, one of the largest Russian tour operators.

Investigation 

On the day of the crash, an investigative commission was established by the Interstate Aviation Committee (IAC) to determine the circumstances and causes of the crash. The investigation was led by Russian air accident investigators, and included representatives of the aviation authorities of the United Arab Emirates (the state of the aircraft's registration and operator), the United States (where the aircraft's designer and manufacturer is headquartered) and France (where the aircraft's engines were designed). The U.S. team consisted of air accident investigators from the National Transportation Safety Board (NTSB), experts from Boeing and representatives of the Federal Aviation Administration (FAA).

The Russian Investigative Committee opened an investigation into any possible safety violations leading to the crash, and allocated more than 50 investigators to work on the case. In a statement, it listed "crew error, technical failure, adverse weather conditions and other factors" as possible reasons for the crash. Terrorism was ruled out as a possibility as no traces of explosives were found.

Progress 
On 20 March 2016, investigators completed a survey of the wreckage. Russian and Emirati experts started an analysis of the radar data, flight crew–ATC communications and meteorological information. Both flight recorders were recovered from the crash site and delivered to the Interstate Aviation Committee in Moscow.

On 20 and 21 March 2016, investigators from Russia, the United Arab Emirates (UAE) and France, extracted the memory modules from their protective casings and downloaded the data from both the flight data recorder (FDR) and the cockpit voice recorder (CVR). Both recorders functioned normally until the time of impact. While their outer casings sustained some damage, the quality of both recordings was good. A transcript of the communication between the Captain and First Officer was prepared, as the data was analyzed. They also began synchronizing information from the flight recorders, ATC data and meteorological information.

On 21 March 2016, investigators in Rostov-on-Don finished collecting debris from the crash site and started reconstructing the fuselage layout in a hangar. Another group of investigators, based in Moscow, together with Emirati investigators, airline representatives and experts from Cyprus and Spain, started to collect and analyse materials on the aircraft's airworthiness, Flight 981's preparation before departure, and the training of its flight crew.

On 23 March 2016, Russian and foreign investigators began to test the Rostov Airport's radio communication equipment, examine ATC communications with other flight crews before the crash and evaluate the actions of the ATC and the airport's meteorological services. Using data retrieved from the flight recorders, as well as information from the aircraft maintenance log and flight documentation, the investigators began to analyse the operation of all Flight 981's aircraft systems, including the flight control system and engines, and also analyze the actions and state of the flight crew during the entire flight.

On 29 March 2016, the IAC announced that preliminary analysis of information from the flight recorders showed no failures of any aircraft systems, engines or other components had been discovered to date. The airworthiness certificate was valid, all necessary maintenance history was in good order at the time of departure. A transcript of more than two hours of the last crew communications was prepared but was not released to the press as international and Russian rules of air crash investigation forbid publication. The IAC requested Boeing provide technical documentation to aid in assessment of the aircraft's system operations and about all similar previous incidents with Boeing airframes.

On 20 April 2016, a first interim report was published by the IAC.

In August 2018, the IAC began reconstructing data from the head-up display (HUD) system.

Final report 
On 26 November 2019, the IAC published the final report stating that the crash was caused by an incorrect aircraft configuration and incorrect crew piloting, and the subsequent loss of the pilot-in-command's situational awareness in nighttime instrument meteorological conditions. The incorrect configuration refers to performing the go-around procedure with retracted landing gear and flaps but with the maximum available thrust consistent with the Windshear Escape Maneuver combined with a light aircraft that led to a substantial excessive nose-up moment.

Reactions 

In light of the disaster, the Governor of Rostov Oblast, Vasily Golubev, announced that the government would pay 1 million rubles (about 15,000 USD) to the families of the victims. The day after the crash, 20 March, was designated as a day of mourning in the region.

On 21 March 2016, Flydubai opened a Family Assistance Centre for the families of the victims in Rostov-on-Don. It announced a payment of US$20,000 per passenger for the "immediate financial needs" of their families. The airline resumed regular flights to Rostov as soon as the airport reopened after the crash, but assigned a different flight number for it.

In a press conference, the airline's CEO, Ghaith Al Ghaith, informed Emirati journalists that specialists from the engineering, safety, and security departments of Flydubai are working closely on the ground with the Russian investigators. He asked the media to refrain from speculation and "give the investigators time to do their job and come out with results".

Five days after the crash, on 24 March 2016, the Crown Prince of Abu Dhabi Mohammed bin Zayed Al Nahyan went to Moscow to discuss the course of the crash investigation with Russian President Vladimir Putin.

Aviation expert Alexander Knivel pointed out multiple similarities between Flight 981 and Tatarstan Airlines Flight 363. In both cases, a Boeing 737 impacted the airfield at a high vertical speed while attempting a go-around. The Flight 363 investigation, conducted by the Interstate Aviation Committee, ruled that the 2013 accident was the result of pilot error; one dissenting commission member, a Rosaviatsiya representative, filed an alternative opinion report, claiming the commission ignored a possible mechanical malfunction of the Boeing 737's elevator controls.

On 28 March 2016, Artyom Kiryanov, a Russian Civic Chamber member, called for Russia's Federal Air Transport Agency and the IAC to suspend the flying certificates of all Russian-owned and -operated Boeing 737 Classics and Next Generation series, until the end of the Flight 981 investigation – citing concerns about the elevator controls in all 737s. After this news reached the U.S., the Boeing company's stock went down 0.81% on the New York Stock Exchange.

On 12 April 2016, the American law firm Ribbeck Law, on behalf of several relatives of the victims, filed a lawsuit against Boeing in the Circuit Court of Cook County in Chicago, pursuing financial compensation of US$5 million per passenger on the flight.

In popular culture
The crash was featured on season 22 of the Canadian documentary series Mayday, in the episode titled "Holding Pattern".

See also
The IAC reports refer to the following accidents:
 Armavia Flight 967 – an Airbus A320 that crashed during a go-around in 2006
 China Airlines Flight 140 – an Airbus A300 that crashed near the runway during a go-around in 1994
 Pulkovo Aviation Enterprise Flight 9560
Aeroflot Flight N-528, a case where pilot errors were made during an attempted go around.
Aeroflot Flight 821, Another 737 which crashed before landing in Russia with spatial disorientation also being at fault
Tatarstan Airlines Flight 363, another 737 which also crashed before landing in Russia with spatial disorientation
John F. Kennedy Jr. plane crash, a Piper Saratoga that crashed off of Martha's Vineyard with the main cause being spatial disorientation

Notes

References

External links

 Interstate Aviation Committee
 Official profile of the investigation
 Interim report (Archive)
 Final report
Official profile of the investigation  – the Russian version is the report of record.
Interim report (Archive) 
Final report 
 Official statements from the airline Flydubai
 
 Official list of victims: from EMERCOM, from Flydubai
 CCTV footage of the aircraft crash (first, second,  third and fourth) and of the second go-around

Transcript of the ATC communications with the crew
 Flight history, according to Flightradar24

2016 in the United Arab Emirates
2010s in Dubai
2016 disasters in Russia
Accidents and incidents involving the Boeing 737 Next Generation
Airliner accidents and incidents caused by pilot error
Aviation accidents and incidents in 2016
Aviation accidents and incidents in Russia
Rostov-on-Don
March 2016 events in Russia